The 2005 1. divisjon (referred to as Adeccoligaen for sponsorship reasons) was a Norwegian second-tier football season. The season kicked off on 10 April 2005, and the final round was played on 30 October 2005. 

Stabæk were promoted to the 2006 Tippeligaen as First Division winners, along with Sandefjord who finished second. Sandefjord will be playing in the top division for the first time while Stabæk return to Tippeligaen after being relegated in 2004. 

As in previous years, there was a two-legged promotion playoff at the end of the season, between the third-placed team in the 1. divisjon (Moss) and the twelfth-placed team in the Tippeligaen (Molde). Molde kept their spot in the Tippeligaen, after beating Moss 5–2 on aggregate.

Mandalskameratene, Skeid, Tønsberg and Alta were relegated to the 2006 2. divisjon at the end of the season.

Team changes from 2004
2004 1. divisjon champions Start and runners-up Aalesund were promoted to the 2005 Tippeligaen. They were replaced by Stabæk and Sogndal, who finished 13th and 14th respectively in the 2004 Tippeligaen season.

Four teams, Raufoss, Haugesund, Vard Haugesund and Tromsdalen, were relegated to the 2005 2. divisjon following the 2004 season. They were replaced by 2004 2. divisjon winners Tønsberg, Follo, Løv-Ham and Alta.

League table

Top goalscorers

Source:

References

External links 
Norwegian Football Association
Fixtures, results and table for Adeccoligaen 2005

Norwegian First Division seasons
2
Norway
Norway